Patti Julian  is an American lawyer and a Democratic former one-term member of the Arkansas House of Representatives for District 38 in Pulaski County.

Education
Julian earned her accounting degree from the University of Arkansas and earned her JD from the University of Arkansas School of Law.

Elections
2012 With Representative John Charles Edwards redistricted to District 35, Julian was unopposed for the May 22, 2012 Democratic Primary and won the four-way November 6, 2012 General election with 6,674 votes (49.7%) against Republican nominee Dean DiMichele, Independent candidate Bill Laman, and Libertarian candidate Debrah Standiford.

References

External links
Official page at the Arkansas House of Representatives

Patti Julian at Ballotpedia
Patti Julian at the National Institute on Money in State Politics

Place of birth missing (living people)
Year of birth missing (living people)
Living people
Arkansas lawyers
Democratic Party members of the Arkansas House of Representatives
Politicians from North Little Rock, Arkansas
University of Arkansas alumni
University of Arkansas School of Law alumni
Women state legislators in Arkansas
American women lawyers
21st-century American women